Khawaja Muhammad Asif (born 9 August 1949) is a  Pakistani politician currently serving as the Defence Minister of Pakistan since April 2022, He has been a member of the National Assembly of Pakistan, since August 2018. Previously, he was a member of the National Assembly from 1993 to 1999 and again from 2002 to 2018 and till date. In May, 2019 he took the charge and became the Parliamentary Leader of PML-N in the National Assembly of Pakistan.

He served as the Minister for Foreign Affairs in the Abbasi cabinet from August 2017 to April 2018 and simultaneously served as the Minister for Defence and Minister for Water and Power in the third Sharif ministry from 2013 to 2017.

Asif began his political career after getting elected to the Senate of Pakistan during the Sharif's first ministry in 1991. Since 1997, he had served as a member of the federal cabinet, in various positions. From 1997 to 1999, he was as the chairman of the Privatization Commission of Pakistan during the second government of Nawaz Sharif. He briefly held the cabinet portfolios of the Minister for Petroleum and Natural Resources in the Gillani ministry in 2008, with an additional charge as Minister for Sports.

Early life and education
Asif was born on 9 August 1949 in Sialkot, Punjab, to Khawaja Muhammad Safdar. He is of Kashmiri ancestry, whose ancestors were long settled in the Punjab province generations ago from the Kashmir Valley. He received his early education at Cadet College Hasan Abdal. He attained his bachelor's degree from Government College University  Lahore , but was gifted L.L.B. degree from the University Law College, Lahore. Asif is a banker by profession and has worked in the different banks of the United Arab Emirates on iqama where he lived for several years until 1999. He has a son and three daughters. 

In 2007, he was awarded honorary doctorate degree in international relations by the Geneva School of Diplomacy and International Relations .

Political career
Asif began his political career in 1991 on returning to Pakistan following the death of his father after living in the United Arab Emirates for many years. In 1991, he was elected to the Senate of Pakistan as a candidate of Pakistan Muslim League (N) (PML-N) for three years. He was elected to the National Assembly of Pakistan from Constituency NA-110 (Sialkot) in 1993 general election.

He was re-elected to the National Assembly in 1997 general election Khawaja Asif contested 2002 general election elections from NA 110 and won his seats by taking 42,743 votes.

Asif contested 2008 general election from NA 110 and obtained 73,007 votes.

In 2013 Pakistani general election, Asif was re-elected as a member of the National Assembly from NA 110 taking 92,848 votes against his opponent Usman Dar who obtained 71,573 votes.

He was re-elected to the National Assembly as a candidate of PML-N from Constituency NA-73 (Sialkot-II) in 2018 Pakistani general election. He received 116,957 votes and defeated Usman Dar who received 115464 votes and won by only 1700+ votes. In May, 2019 he took the charge and became the Parliamentary Leader of PMLN in the National Assembly of Pakistan.

Ministrial career

In 1997 Government
He was appointed as the chairman of the Privatization Commission of Pakistan with the status of a minister during Second Nawaz Sharif ministry in 1997. His tenure was terminated following the counter-coup 1999 coup d'état in which then Chief of Army Staff, Pervez Musharraf, overthrew Prime Minister Nawaz Sharif in response to Sharif indirectly hijacking Musharraf's plane and ordering it to land outside Pakistan.

During 2008 coalition government
He was briefly appointed as the Minister of Petroleum and Natural Resources, as well as the Minister of Sports in the Gillani ministry in 2008 before his party pulled out of the Pakistan Peoples Party-led coalition government.

During 2013 Third Nawaz Sharif ministry
In June 2013, he was appointed as the Minister of Water and Power and later given additional portfolio of Minister of Defence in November 2013 under Third Nawaz Sharif ministry.

During 2017 Abbasi ministry
He had ceased to hold ministerial office in July 2017 when the federal cabinet was disbanded following the resignation of Prime Minister Nawaz Sharif after Panama Papers case decision. Following the election of Shahid Khaqan Abbasi as Prime Minister of Pakistan, Asif was inducted into the federal cabinet of Abbasi and was appointed Minister for Foreign Affairs for the first time. Earlier, Pakistan had no Minister for Foreign Affairs since the PML-N came to power in May 2013 as former Prime Minister Nawaz Sharif himself held the cabinet portfolio of foreign affairs.

Controversy and scandals
The National Accountability Bureau (NAB) took Asif into its custody on corruption charges after the military takeover but later, he was released.

Dual nationality controversy
In June 2012, a petition admitted by the Supreme Court of Pakistan's registrar stated that Asif holds dual nationality, and hence, according to Pakistan's constitution, he is not eligible to hold public office in Pakistan. Following this, the Federal Investigations Agency and the Supreme Court began an investigation pursuing inquiries of Asif's dual nationality charges. The court did not find him guilty of the charges petitioned against him; the petitioner who leveled the charges withdrew the accusations and issued a formal apology.

Rigging allegations in 2013 elections
Asif's victory was challenged in 2013 elections by Pakistan Tehreek-e-Insaf (PTI), alleging he had received fake votes. On 10 November 2016 Supreme Court dismissed this petition.

Work permit controversy in 2018 elections
On 26 April 2018, he was disqualified from holding a public office for life by the Islamabad High Court over possessing a UAE work permit.
He was unseated by the Election Commission of Pakistan as Member of the National Assembly. Following this Asif challenged his disqualification in the Supreme Court. In June 2018, the Supreme Court suspended the lifetime disqualification and declared the decision of Islamabad High Court null and void, and allowed Asif to contest elections.

Asset beyond means case
He was arrested on 29 December 2020 by National Accountability Bureau (NAB) in assets beyond means case.
He was released on bail by Lahore High Court on 23 June 2021 in the assets beyond means case.

References

External links 
 

|-

|-

|-

|-

 

Living people
1949 births
Members of the Senate of Pakistan
Pakistani people of Kashmiri descent
Pakistani prisoners and detainees
Pakistani bankers
Punjabi people
Punjab University Law College alumni
Alumni of the London School of Economics
Pakistan Muslim League (N) MNAs
Water and Power Ministers of Pakistan
Defence Ministers of Pakistan
Politicians from Sialkot
Pakistani expatriates in the United Arab Emirates
Government College University, Lahore alumni
Pakistani MNAs 1993–1996
Pakistani MNAs 1997–1999
Pakistani MNAs 2002–2007
Pakistani MNAs 2008–2013
Pakistani MNAs 2018–2023
Cadet College Hasan Abdal alumni
Bank of Credit and Commerce International people